The Trojan Women is an ancient Greek tragedy written by Euripides, also translated as Women of Troy

The Trojan Women or The Women of Troy may also refer to:
The Trojan Women (film), a 1971 American-British-Greek drama film, based on Euripides' play
 The Women of Troy, 2021 novel by Pat Barker
 Women of Troy, nickname for the women's athletic teams USC Trojans, representing the University of Southern California